Anodot is an American data analytics company that uses machine learning and artificial intelligence for business monitoring and anomaly detection.

History 
Anodot was founded in 2014 by David Drai along with Ira Cohen, former Chief Data Scientist at HP. Prior to that, Drai was the CTO at Akamai. While working as CTO at GetTaxi, he realized that there is a need for real time data analytics. He started working on developing a software that can be paired for data analysis and visualization. Drai sought financing to start Anodot and received the seed round of funding of $1.5 million in 2014 from Disruptive Technologies Venture Capital. In the next three years, the company raised three rounds of funding for expansion, bringing the company's total venture capital backing to $27.5 million.

Anodot is one of the data analytics companies that competes with established firms to provide data analysis and visualization in a real time. The company claims that it started analyzing well over 5.2 billion data points per day within six months of its launch.  

In 2018, Anodot announced Andy Fenselau as Chief Marketing Officer and Amit Levi as the VP Head of Product. Later in the year, Anodot partnered with Deloitte Australia, where Deloitte used its technology to process its client's data and gain insights. In 2020, the company announced partnership with Amazon AWS to monitor business metrics.

The company possesses two U.S. patents for algorithms of machine learning-based anomaly detection. Anodot has offices in Israel, UK and Australia and has majority of its client base in digital business and telecom industry.

Technology 
Anodot launched a data analytics platform that analyzes real time structured metrics data and unstructured log data and it independently detects and correlates anomalies and forecasts business in real time. According to the company, the algorithms are designed specifically to quickly identify the source of anomalies in large data sets, and perform root-cause analysis.

Funding 
The company raised $62.5 million in funding by April 2020 with most recent funding Series C round of $35 million led by Intel Capital and included SoftBank Ventures Asia, Samsung NEXT, Aleph and Redline Capital Management.

References

Data analysis software
2014 establishments in California
Technology companies based in the San Francisco Bay Area
American companies established in 2014
Technology companies established in 2014